Ji-hae is a Korean unisex given name, in modern times predominantly feminine. The meaning differs based on the Hanja used to write each syllable of the name. There are 46 Hanja with the reading  and 23 Hanja with the reading  on the South Korean government's official list of Hanja which may be used in given names.
 
People with this name include:
 Jeong Ji-hae, male Joseon Dynasty archaeologist
 Jung Ji-hae (born 1985), female South Korean handball player

Separately, some people with the name spelled as Ji-hye in the Revised Romanization of Korean choose to spell it as Ji-hae in English:
 Ryu Ji-hae (born 1976), female South Korean table tennis player
 Ji-Hae Park (born 1985), female South Korean violinist
 Jihae (musician) (born ), female South Korean singer and actress

See also
List of Korean given names

References

Korean unisex given names